Dodanga is a genus of moths of the family Crambidae.

Species
Dodanga cristata Hampson, 1891
Dodanga lobipennis Moore, 1884-87

References

Acentropinae
Crambidae genera
Taxa named by Frederic Moore